The 1919 Norwegian Football Cup was the 18th season of the Norwegian annual knockout football tournament. The tournament was open for all members of NFF. Odd won their seventh title, having beaten Frigg in the final. Kvik (Fredrikshald) were the defending champions, but were eliminated by Fram (Larvik) in the quarterfinal.

First round

|colspan="3" style="background-color:#97DEFF"|7 September 1919

|}

Second round

|colspan="3" style="background-color:#97DEFF"|7 September 1919

|}

Third round

|colspan="3" style="background-color:#97DEFF"|7 September 1919

|}

Quarter-finals

|colspan="3" style="background-color:#97DEFF"|28 September 1919

|}

Semi-finals

|colspan="3" style="background-color:#97DEFF"|5 October 1919

|}

Final

See also
1919 in Norwegian football

References

Norwegian Football Cup seasons
Norway
Football Cup